Bahía Soledad Airstrip was a private dirt airstrip located in Bahía Soledad, a private beach located 30 km south of Ensenada, Municipality of Ensenada, Baja California, Mexico, on the Pacific Ocean coast. The airstrip was used solely for general aviation. From April 2007, the airport was abandoned. The BSO code is used as identifier. The only operator at the airport is Aeromaan, with only occasional flights.

External links
Bahía Soledad area photos

Defunct airports in Baja California